The Bayer designation υ Puppis (Upsilon Puppis) is shared by two stars in the constellation Puppis:
υ1 Puppis (NV Puppis), a γ Cassiopeiae variable and spectroscopic binary
υ2 Puppis (NW Puppis), a β Cephei variable

Puppis, Upsilon
Puppis